Frederick James H. Foster (born December 1995) is an English first-class cricketer.

Foster was born in Westminster and educated at Eltham College and Durham University. From Durham he progressed to study for a PhD in chemistry at St Cross College, Oxford. While studying at Oxford, he made a single appearance for Oxford University against Cambridge University in The University Matches of 2019 at Fenner's. Foster took three wickets in the match with his slow left-arm orthodox bowling, taking the wickets of Nathan Johns in the Cambridge first innings, in addition to Nick Taylor and Edward Hyde in their second-innings, finishing with match figures of 3 for 80. He batted once in the Oxford, scoring a single run before being run out by James Vitali.

References

External links

1995 births
Living people
People from Westminster
People educated at Eltham College
Alumni of Durham University
Alumni of St Cross College, Oxford
English cricketers
Oxford University cricketers